Sakarya BB Pro Team is a Turkish professional road bicycle racing team which participates in elite races. The team registered with the UCI for the 2019 season.

Team roster

Major results
2019
Grand Prix Justiniano Hotels, Onur Balkan
Stage 3 Tour of Mesopotamia, Onur Balkan
Stage 4 Tour of Mesopotamia, Ahmet Örken
Overall Yavuz Sultan Selim Tour of Black Sea, Onur Balkan
Stages 2 & 3, Onur Balkan
Tour de Ribas, Onur Balkan
Bursa Orhangazi Race, Onur Balkan
Bursa Yildirim Bayezit Race, Mustafa Sayar
 National Road Race Championships, Ahmet Örken
 National U23 Road Race Championships, Halil İbrahim Doğan
 National Time Trial Championships, Ahmet Örken
Grand Prix Velo Erciyes, Onur Balkan
Overall Tour of Central Anatolia, Ahmet Örken
Stage 1, Ahmet Örken
Stage 2, Onur Balkan
Overall Tour of Kayseri, Onur Balkan 
Stage 2, Onur Balkan
Stage 3 Tour of Mevlana, Ahmet Örken
Fatih Sultan Mehmet Kirklareli Race, Ahmet Örken
2020
GP Belek, Emre Yavuz
 National Road Race Championships, Onur Balkan
 National Time Trial Championships, Mustafa Sayar
2021
GP Mediterrennean, Onur Balkan
 National Road Race Championships, Onur Balkan

National Champions
2019
 Turkish Road Race, Ahmet Örken
 Turkish U23 Road Race, Halil İbrahim Doğan
 Turkish Time Trial, Ahmet Örken
2020
 Turkish Road Race, Onur Balkan
 Turkish Time Trial, Mustafa Sayar
2021
 Turkish Road Race, Onur Balkan
2022
 Azerbaijan Road Race, Elchin Asadov
 Azerbaijan Time Trial, Elchin Asadov
 Azerbaijan U23 Time Trial, Ali Gurbianov

References

External links

Cycling teams established in 2018
UCI Continental Teams (Europe)
Cycling teams based in Turkey